Arțari may refer to several places in Romania:

 Arțari, a village in Ileana Commune, Călăraşi County
 Arțari, a village in Hănțești Commune, Suceava County